The Latakia Sanjak was a prefecture (sanjak) of the Ottoman Empire, located in modern-day Syria. The city of Latakia was the Sanjak's capital. It had a population of 144,447 in 1914. The sanjak included four districts (kaza): Latakia (Lazikiyye), Jableh (Cebele), Sahyun (Sahyûn) and Margat (Markab).

References

Latakia
States and territories established in 1579
Sanjaks of Ottoman Syria
1579 establishments in the Ottoman Empire
1918 disestablishments in the Ottoman Empire